Helga Müller was a West German luger who competed during the 1950s. She won the silver medal in the women's singles event at the 1957 FIL World Luge Championships in Davos, Switzerland.

References
Hickok sports information on World champions in luge and skeleton.

German female lugers
Possibly living people
Year of birth missing